Stanley George Evans  (born 14 July 1930) is a former South Australian LCL and Liberal politician, representing Onkaparinga from 1968 to 1970, Fisher from 1970 to 1985 and Davenport from 1985 to 1993.

Parliament
A 1983 electoral redistribution significantly altered Fisher, cutting Evans' majority from a safe 9.2 percent to a marginal 2.1 percent.  Most of the strongly Liberal areas of the old Fisher were transferred to the safe Liberal seat of Davenport, prompting Evans to challenge fellow Liberal Dean Brown for preselection in Davenport. The ensuing preselection contest turned into a factional battle; Evans was from the conservative wing of the Liberal Party while Brown was from the moderate wing. Evans lost preselection for the 1985 election to Brown, but stood as an Independent Liberal and defeated him.

Evans nevertheless maintained his Liberal Party membership, because at that time the Liberals did not have a policy of expelling members who opposed endorsed candidates.

He rejoined the Liberal partyroom shortly after the election, and stood in the 1989 election as the endorsed Liberal candidate for Davenport. He retired at the 1993 election.

At age 88, Evans stood for local government election in the Ranges Ward of the Adelaide Hills Council in 2018, but was not one of the seven successful candidates from a field of 13.

Family
His son Iain Evans succeeded him as the member for Davenport, and held the seat from 1993 to 2014. Iain was also the state Liberal leader and Leader of the Opposition from 2006 to 2007.

References

 

Members of the South Australian House of Assembly
Liberal Party of Australia members of the Parliament of South Australia
1930 births
Living people
Liberal and Country League politicians
Recipients of the Medal of the Order of Australia